Postmodernism is a philosophical concept.

It may also refer to:
 Postmodernity

or the influence of Postmodernism in various disciplines:
 Postmodern art
 Postmodern feminism
 Postmodern film
 Postmodernism (international relations)
 Postmodern literature
 Postmodernism (music)
 Postmodernism (political science)
 Postmodern philosophy
 Postmodern theatre

or foundational books about the topic:
 Postmodernism, or, the Cultural Logic of Late Capitalism, by Fredric Jameson
 The Postmodern Condition, by Jean-François Lyotard

See also 

 Postmodernism Generator, a computer program